Radical is the ninth and final studio album by American metalcore band Every Time I Die. It was released on October 22, 2021, and was the band's first studio album in 5 years, since 2016's Low Teens, as well as their first and only release to feature drummer Clayton "Goose" Holyoak. Radical was named album of the year in 2021 by Kerrang!

Background and release
On September 9, 2019, the band confirmed that they had started work on their ninth album. They later announced during the January 2020 UK/EU tour supporting While She Sleeps, that the recording process of the album would start once they returned to the US. The band completed recording before the COVID-19 pandemic escalated in the United States in early 2020, leading them to hold off on releasing the album until they were able to tour in support of it. Vocalist Keith Buckley explained in a recent interview, "I dared myself to make some drastic changes in my life. During the pandemic, everything just came to a head. The thing is, we were already done writing and recording the record. The pandemic didn’t actually influence the record at all, but it did influence the way that the record lives. Songs like “Post-Boredom” came to have a new meaning after the pandemic. Songs like “Dark Distance” look a little strange now in hindsight, considering it was written before the pandemic, asking for a plague to happen."

On December 8, 2020, the band released two new songs called "A Colossal Wreck" and "Desperate Pleasures" in the lead-up to their live stream event which took place on December 19, 2020 instead of their annual Tid the Season show. A third track, "AWOL" was released on February 1, 2021.

On August 17, 2021, the band released the song "Post-Boredom" as a single for their album Radical, which they also announced that day. The band also did a pop-up show in Buffalo on August 26, as well as a show for the Ghost Inside's east coast return show on August 28, where they debuted "Post-Boredom".

Two more singles were released in advance, closer to the album's release date; "Planet Shit" on September 13, 2021 and "Thing with Feathers", via music video on the album's release date, October 22, 2021. The latter song features Andy Hull of Manchester Orchestra, and it was written in memory of the Buckley brothers' sister Jaclyn, who lived with Rett syndrome and died from it in early 2017. Since then, Keith has encouraged disabled attendees of the band's shows to tag him personally.

As with Low Teens, the album was again produced by Will Putney, guitarist of Fit for an Autopsy, known for his production work with the Acacia Strain, Body Count, and The Amity Affliction.

Touring cancellation and band's split
In support of the album, the band was set to tour the UK from January 27 to February 5, 2022, with other bands such as Sanction, Jesus Piece, and the Bronx. However, on December 4, 2021, vocalist Keith Buckley announced that he is taking a hiatus from the band for his mental health. Due to Keith's departure and their UK tour being cancelled by COVID restrictions, the band eventually broke up in January 2022.

Accolades

Year-end lists

Track listing

Personnel 

Every Time I Die
 Keith Buckley – vocals
 Jordan Buckley – guitar
 Andrew Williams – guitar
 Stephen Micciche – bass
 Clayton “Goose” Holyoak – drums

Guest musicians
 Josh Scogin - vocals on "All This and War"
 Andy Hull – vocals on "Thing with Feathers"

Production
 Will Putney – production, engineering, mixing, mastering
 Steve Seid – additional engineering
 Jay Zubricky – additional engineering
 Geo Hewitt – additional editing

Visual art
 Corey Meyers – art, design

Studios
 GCR Audio, Buffalo, NY – recording
 Graphic Nature Audio in Belleville, NJ – mixing, mastering

Charts

References

External links
 
 Radical at Epitaph

2021 albums
Albums produced by Will Putney
Epitaph Records albums
Every Time I Die albums